The 2015 Citi Open was a tennis tournament played on outdoor hard courts at the William H.G. FitzGerald Tennis Center in Rock Creek Park, Washington, D.C.

Jean-Julien Rojer and Horia Tecău were the defending champions, but chose not to participate in the 2015 Citi Open.

Bob and Mike Bryan won the title, defeating Ivan Dodig and Marcelo Melo in the final, 6–4, 6–2.

Seeds

Draw

Draw

Qualifying

Seeds

Qualifiers
  Austin Krajicek /  Nicholas Monroe

Lucky losers
  Treat Huey /  Scott Lipsky

Qualifying draw

References
Main Draw
Qualifying Draw

Citi Open - Men's Doubles